Didier Hauss is a French glider pilot, World Champion in 2014 and European Champion in 2015.

References

French glider pilots